Juan José Montes Valderrama (born 15 July 1989) is a Mexican professional boxer. He challenged for the WBC super flyweight title in 2011.

Professional career
Montes defeated Francisco Reyes for the second time in over a year to retain the WBC Continental Americas crown via a 12-round unanimous decision. On November 28, 2009, Montes beat contender Fernando Lumacad by a 10-round majority decision to win the WBC Youth World Super Flyweight title.

On 2 October 2010, Montes defeated Filipino Sylvester Lopez in a WBC Super Flyweight title eliminator bout. Montes knocked Lopez to the canvas in the first round. In the third round, Montes suffered a headbutt which caused a cut above his right eye and resulted in Lopez being deducted a point. The referee was ultimately forced to stop the bout in the fifth round due to the severity of the cut and Montes was awarded a unanimous technical decision.

WBC super flyweight title
In May, Montes will fight Tomás Rojas for the WBC Super Flyweight title.

Professional boxing record

| style="text-align:center;" colspan="8"|25 Wins (15 knockouts), 6 Losses  2 Draws
|-
|align=center style="border-style: none none solid solid; background: #e3e3e3"|Res.
|align=center style="border-style: none none solid solid; background: #e3e3e3"|Record
|align=center style="border-style: none none solid solid; background: #e3e3e3"|Opponent
|align=center style="border-style: none none solid solid; background: #e3e3e3"|Type
|align=center style="border-style: none none solid solid; background: #e3e3e3"|Rd., Time
|align=center style="border-style: none none solid solid; background: #e3e3e3"|Date
|align=center style="border-style: none none solid solid; background: #e3e3e3"|Location
|align=center style="border-style: none none solid solid; background: #e3e3e3"|Notes
|-align=center
|Loss
|25-6-2
|align=left| Oscar Duarte
|
|
|
|align=left|
|align=left|
|-align=center
|Win
|25-5-2
|align=left| Jose Servin
|
|
|
|align=left|
|align=left|
|-align=center
|Win
|24-5-2
|align=left| Francisco Suarez
|
|
|
|align=left|
|align=left|
|-align=center
|Loss
|23-5-2
|align=left| Edgar Monarrez
|
|
|
|align=left|
|align=left|
|-align=center
|Loss
|23-4-2
|align=left| Julio Ceja
|
|
|
|align=left|
|align=left|
|-align=center
|Draw||23-3-2 ||align=left| Julio César Miranda
|
|
|
|align=left|
|align=left|
|-align=center
|Loss||23-3-1 ||align=left| Martin Casillas
|
|
|
|align=left|
|align=left|
|-align=center
|Win||23-2-1 ||align=left| Oscar Ibarra
|
|
|
|align=left|
|align=left|
|-align=center
|Draw||22-2-1 ||align=left| Victor Zaleta
|
|
|
|align=left|
|align=left|
|-align=center
|Win||22-2 ||align=left| Oscar Ibarra
|
|
|
|align=left|
|align=left|
|-align=center
|Win||21-2 ||align=left| Jose Luis Rosales
|
|
|
|align=left|
|align=left|
|-align=center
|Win||20-2 ||align=left| Sammy Reyes
|
|
|
|align=left|
|align=left|
|-align=center
|Loss||19-2 ||align=left| Tomas Rojas
|
|
|
|align=left|
|align=left|
|-align=center
|Win||19-1 ||align=left| Silvester Lopez
|
|
|
|align=left|
|align=left|
|-align=center
|Win||18-1 ||align=left| Richard Garcia
|
|
|
|align=left|
|align=left|
|-align=center
|Win||17-1 ||align=left| Roberto Carlos Leyva
|
|
|
|align=left|
|align=left|
|-align=center
|Win||16-1 ||align=left| Fernando Lumacad
|
|
|
|align=left|
|align=left|
|-align=center
|Win||15-1 ||align=left| Jose Salgado
|
|
|
|align=left|
|align=left|

References

External links

Boxers from Jalisco
Sportspeople from Guadalajara, Jalisco
Super-flyweight boxers
1989 births
Living people
Mexican male boxers